Galaxian may refer to:

Galaxian video games by Namco
Galaxian (1979 arcade game), shooter video game by Namco
Namco Galaxian (1980 arcade hardware), arcade cabinet video game hardware by Namco
Galaxian 2 (1981 video game), handheld shooter video game by Emtex, 2-player game based on Galaxian
Galaxian³ (1990 arcade game), shooter video game by Namco

Astro Wars (1981 video game), aka Super Galaxian, tabletop shooter video game
Galaxian (album), 1980 album by The Jeff Lorber Fusion
Galaxians (supporters group), booster group for the soccer team L.A. Galaxy

See also
Galaga (disambiguation)
Galaxy (disambiguation)
Galaxia (disambiguation)
Galactic (disambiguation)